Roger S. Tighe (23 July 1944 – July 2022) was a boxer who competed for England.

Boxing career
He represented England and won a gold medal in the 81 kg light-heavyweight, at the 1966 British Empire and Commonwealth Games in Kingston, Jamaica.

He made his professional debut on 24 October 1966 and fought in 38 fights until 1976.

Tighe won the Amateur Boxing Association 1966 light heavyweight title, when boxing out of the Hull Boys Boxing Club.

Personal life
Tighe died in July 2022, at the age of 77.

References

1944 births
2022 deaths
Boxers at the 1966 British Empire and Commonwealth Games
Commonwealth Games gold medallists for England
Commonwealth Games medallists in boxing
English male boxers
Light-heavyweight boxers
Sportspeople from Kingston upon Hull
Medallists at the 1966 British Empire and Commonwealth Games